Neurobeachin-like 2 is a protein that in humans is encoded by the NBEAL2 gene.

Function 
The protein encoded by this gene contains a beige and Chediak-Higashi (BEACH) domain and multiple WD40 domains, and may play a role in megakaryocyte alpha-granule biogenesis.

Clinical relevance
Mutation in this gene have been shown to cause gray platelet syndrome.

References

Further reading